Maria Marinela Mazilu (born April 12, 1991 in Râmnicu Vâlcea) is a Romanian skeleton racer on the Skeleton World Cup circuit.  She began competing in 2002 and was selected to the national team in 2004.  She was the bronze medalist at the Junior World Championships at Igls in 2012 and again at Winterberg in 2014. Mazilu qualified for the 2010 Winter Olympics in Vancouver where she finished 19th, and for the 2014 Winter Olympics in Sochi where she finished 20th.

References

External links
 
 

1991 births
Living people
Olympic skeleton racers of Romania
Romanian female skeleton racers
Skeleton racers at the 2010 Winter Olympics
Skeleton racers at the 2014 Winter Olympics
Skeleton racers at the 2018 Winter Olympics
Sportspeople from Râmnicu Vâlcea
20th-century Romanian women
21st-century Romanian women